The Danzig Highflyer is a breed of fancy pigeon developed over many years of selective breeding. Danzig Highflyers, along with other varieties of domesticated pigeons, are all descendants from the rock pigeon (Columba livia). There are two major variates of the Danzig Highflyer: ones that are bred for show, and others as pets for flying.

History
It is thought this breed had its origin in the vicinity of Danzig (now Gdansk) in 1807. Other sources point to the ancient province of Galicia-Poland

See also 

List of pigeon breeds

References

Pigeon breeds
Pigeon breeds originating in Germany
Pigeon breeds originating in Poland
Pigeon breeds originating in Prussia